This is the list of all FK Rabotnički's European matches.

Summary

By competition

Source: UEFA.com, Last updated on 19 July 2018Pld = Matches played; W = Matches won; D = Matches drawn; L = Matches lost; GF = Goals for; GA = Goals against. Defunct competitions indicated in italics.

By ground

Last updated: 19 July 2018

Results

Player records 
Most appearances in UEFA club competitions: 22 appearances
Krste Velkoski
Top scorers in UEFA club competitions: 6 goals
Krste Velkoski

UEFA club coefficient ranking

Current
(As of 19 April 2017), Source:

Rankings

Source:

2008–2017

References

Europe
Rabotnicki